The Thames-Coromandel District is a territorial authority district in the North Island of New Zealand, covering all the Coromandel Peninsula and extending south to Hikutaia.

It is administered by the Thames-Coromandel District Council, which has its seat in the town of Thames. It was the first district council to be formed in New Zealand, being constituted in 1975. The district lies within the Waikato Regional Council area. Its only land boundary is with Hauraki District.

Demographics

Thames-Coromandel District had a population of 29,895 at the 2018 New Zealand census, an increase of 3,717 people (14.2%) since the 2013 census, and an increase of 3,957 people (15.3%) since the 2006 census. There were 12,471 households, comprising 14,625 males and 15,273 females, giving a sex ratio of 0.96 males per female. The median age was 53.6 years (compared with 37.4 years nationally), with 4,488 people (15.0%) aged under 15 years, 3,537 (11.8%) aged 15 to 29, 12,600 (42.1%) aged 30 to 64, and 9,273 (31.0%) aged 65 or older.

Ethnicities were 87.9% European/Pākehā, 18.3% Māori, 2.1% Pacific peoples, 3.4% Asian, and 1.7% other ethnicities. People may identify with more than one ethnicity.

The percentage of people born overseas was 16.4, compared with 27.1% nationally.

Although some people chose not to answer the census's question about religious affiliation, 54.4% had no religion, 33.0% were Christian, 1.0% had Māori religious beliefs, 0.6% were Hindu, 0.2% were Muslim, 0.9% were Buddhist and 2.0% had other religions.

Of those at least 15 years old, 3,591 (14.1%) people had a bachelor's or higher degree, and 5,874 (23.1%) people had no formal qualifications. The median income was $24,900, compared with $31,800 nationally. 2,622 people (10.3%) earned over $70,000 compared to 17.2% nationally. The employment status of those at least 15 was that 9,414 (37.1%) people were employed full-time, 4,359 (17.2%) were part-time, and 633 (2.5%) were unemployed.

Local government
The Thames-Coromandel District Council was formed from the amalgamation of the Thames Borough, Thames County and Coromandel County councils in 1975, and is led by the Mayor of Thames-Coromandel.

History 
In 1923 the constituent counties included -

References

External links

 
1975 establishments in New Zealand